Alexander Ewan Armstrong (15 June 1916 – 27 April 1985) was a politician, grazier and businessman in New South Wales, Australia.

Armstrong was born in Sydney to doctor George Armstrong and Florence Edith Ewan. He attended Scots College and became a grazier, working first on the family's Albury property and then at Winderadeen and Collector. On 10 February 1945, he married Marjorie Alma Goodhew and they had two daughters. He later divorced, and remarried Margaret Rose Cleary in July 1963.

A member of the Liberal Party, he was elected to the New South Wales Legislative Council in 1952. In 1956, he defected to the Country Party. In 1968 the Supreme Court found that Armstrong had threatened to have a business associate killed, and on 25 February 1969 the Legislative Council passed a resolution that he was guilty of conduct unworthy of a member of the council and that he be expelled. Armstrong unsuccessfully challenged his expulsion in the Court of Appeal.

He died at Alice Springs in 1985.

References

1916 births
1985 deaths
Liberal Party of Australia members of the Parliament of New South Wales
National Party of Australia members of the Parliament of New South Wales
Members of the New South Wales Legislative Council
People expelled from public office
20th-century Australian politicians
Politicians from Sydney